The 2014 United States Senate election in Delaware was held on November 4, 2014 to elect a member of the United States Senate to represent the State of Delaware, concurrently with other elections to the United States Senate in other states and elections to the United States House of Representatives and various state and local elections.

Incumbent Democratic Senator Chris Coons ran for re-election to a first full term in office. He was unopposed for the Democratic nomination and defeated Republican businessman Kevin Wade in the general election.

Background 
Democratic Senator Joe Biden was re-elected to a seventh term in 2008, defeating Republican political commentator Christine O'Donnell by 65% to 35%. At the same time, he was elected Vice President of the United States and resigned his Senate seat to be sworn-in as Vice President in January 2009. Delaware Governor Ruth Ann Minner appointed Biden's longtime aide Ted Kaufman to the seat until a special election was held in November 2010. In the election, Christine O'Donnell ran again and upset U.S. Representative and former Governor Mike Castle in the Republican primary to face Democrat Chris Coons, who had run unopposed for his party's nomination. In the general election, Coons defeated O'Donnell by 57% to 40% and was sworn-in later that month.

Democratic primary

Candidates

Declared 
 Chris Coons, incumbent U.S. Senator

Declined 
 Beau Biden, Delaware Attorney General and son of then Vice President Joe Biden

Republican primary

Candidates

Declared 
 Carl Smink, retired engineer and businessman
 Kevin Wade, businessman and nominee for the U.S. Senate in 2012

Declined 
 Mike Castle, former U.S. Representative, former Governor of Delaware and candidate for the U.S. Senate in 2010
 Tom Kovach, New Castle County Council President and nominee for Delaware's at-large congressional district in 2012
 Christine O'Donnell, political commentator, candidate for the U.S. Senate in 2006 and nominee for the U.S. Senate in 2008 and 2010

Primary results

Other candidates

Green Party

Nominee 
 Andrew Groff, computer science professor and nominee for the U.S. Senate in 2012

General election

Fundraising

Debates 
 This is a video of the sole debate held on October 15, 2014

Predictions

Polling

Results 
Coons easily won the election to a full term, with 56% of the vote. Coons was projected the winner right when the polls closed in Delaware. Wade conceded defeat at 8:32 P.M. EST.

See also 
 2014 United States Senate elections
 2014 United States elections
 2014 United States House of Representatives election in Delaware

References

External links 
 U.S. Senate elections in Delaware, 2014 at Ballotpedia
 Campaign contributions at OpenSecrets
 Chris Coons for U.S. Senate
 Carl Smink for U.S. Senate
 Kevin Wade for U.S. Senate

Delaware
2014
United States Senate